Ritu Khanduri Bhushan is an Indian politician and the MLA from Kotdwar Assembly. She is a member of the Bharatiya Janata Party.

Positions held

Elections contested

References 

Living people
People from Pauri Garhwal district
Uttarakhand MLAs 2022–2027
Uttarakhand MLAs 2017–2022
Bharatiya Janata Party politicians from Uttarakhand
1965 births